Edward Hagen (March 21, 1875 – November 5, 1950) was an American farmer, educator, and politician.

Hagen was born on a farm in Big Bend Township, Chippewa County, Minnesota and went to the Chippewa County public schools. He graduated from the University of Minnesota School of Agriculture in 1895. Hagen lived in Milan, Minnesota with his wife and family. He was a farmer and taught at the Chippewa County Rural Schools. Hagen served as the Big Bend Township justice of the peace, assessor, and supervisor. He also served in the Minnesota House of Representatives from 1933 to 1942 and in the Minnesota Senate from 1943 until his death in 1950.

References

1875 births
1950 deaths
People from Chippewa County, Minnesota
University of Minnesota alumni
Farmers from Minnesota
Schoolteachers from Minnesota
Members of the Minnesota House of Representatives
Minnesota state senators